Passyunk may refer to:
Passyunk Township, Pennsylvania
Passyunk Square, Philadelphia
Passyunk Avenue Bridge